The United Nations Office of Information Communications Technology (OICT) is an office of the U.N. Secretariat, headquartered in New York City.

References